The 2003 Canadian Senior Curling Championships were held January 18–26 at the Lethbridge Curling Club in Lethbridge, Alberta.

Men's

Teams

Standings

Results

Draw 1

Draw 2

Draw 3

Draw 4

Draw 5

Draw 6

Draw 7

Draw 8

Draw 9

Draw 10

Draw 11

Draw 12

Draw 13

Draw 14

Draw 15

Draw 16

Draw 17

Playoffs

Semifinal

Final

Women's

Teams

Standings

Results

Draw 1

Draw 2

Draw 3

Draw 4

Draw 5

Draw 6

Draw 7

Draw 8

Draw 9

Draw 10

Draw 11

Draw 12

Draw 13

Draw 14

Draw 15

Draw 16

Draw 17

Playoffs

Semifinal

Final

References

External links
Men's statistics
Women's statistics

2003 in Canadian curling
Canadian Senior Curling Championships
Curling competitions in Alberta
2003 in Alberta
Sport in Lethbridge
January 2003 sports events in Canada